The D.I.C.E. Award for Adventure Game of the Year is an award presented annually by the Academy of Interactive Arts & Sciences during the academy's annual D.I.C.E. Awards. This award recognizes titles in which players are challenged with real-time action activities where timing, skill, and accuracy are necessary to succeed. Puzzle-solving, resource management and exploration often drive the quest oriented narrative rather than primarily combat mechanics. The award initially had separate awards for console action games and computer games at the 1st Annual Interactive Achievement Awards in 1998 with the first winners being Final Fantasy VII for console and Blade Runner for computer. There have been numerous mergers, additions of action-related games. The current version was officially introduced at the 11th Annual Interactive Achievement Awards in 2008, which was awarded to Super Mario Galaxy.

The award's most recent winner is God of War Ragnarök developed by Santa Monica Studio and published by Sony Interactive Entertainment.

History 

Initially the Interactive Achievement Awards had separate awards for Console Adventure Game of the Year and Computer Adventure Game of the Year. The adventure category was merged with the Role Playing category at the 2000 awards. This was probably because the previous console adventure game winners also won the award for console role-playing, which were Final Fantasy VII in 1998 and The Legend of Zelda in 1999. In 2001, the awards for action games and adventure games were consolidated to Action/Adventure awards, recognizing titles in which players are challenged with real-time action activities and combat where possibly skill, accuracy and puzzle-solving are required. A category for Console Platform Action/Adventure Game of the Year was also introduced in 2003, which would be renamed to just Platform Action/Adventure Game of the Year in 2004. Starting in 2005, genre specific awards would no longer have separate awards for console and computer games. So there would be just one Action/Adventure Game of the Year award, which included platform games going forward. This would ultimately be separated into Action Game of the Year and Adventure Game of the Year in 2008.
 Console Adventure Game of the Year (1998—1999)
 Computer Adventure Game of the Year (1998—1999)
 Console Adventure/Role-Playing Game of the Year (2000)
 Computer Adventure/Role-Playing Game of the Year (2000)
 Console Action/Adventure Game of the Year (2001—2005)
 Computer Action/Adventure Game of the Year (2001—2005)
 Console Platform Action/Adventure Game of the Year (2003)
 Platform Action/Adventure Game of the Year (2004—2005)
 Action/Adventure Game of the Year (2006—2007)
 Adventure Game of the Year (2008—present)

Winners and nominees

1990s

2000s

2010s

2020s

Multiple nominations and wins

Developers and publishers 
Out of the all the publishers Sony has published most nominees and the most winners for Adventure related awards. Ubisoft Montreal has developed the most nominees while Nintendo, internally, has developed the most award winners. Ubisoft Montreal and Ubisoft are the only developer and publisher, respectively to win more than adventure game award for the same game in the same year with Prince of Persia: The Sands of Time. Rockstar North and Rockstar Games also won multiple awards in the same year, but for different games. Ubisoft Montreal is also the only developer to have back-to-back wins for the same category, being Platform Action/Adventure Game of the Year in 2004 and 2005. Ubisoft as a publisher also had back-to-back wins for Computer Action/Adventure Game of the Year in 2004 and 2005, but with different developers.

Franchises 
The Legend of Zelda franchise has received the most nominations and won the most awards. The Assassin's Creed franchise is second in nominations but has not won a single award. The Legend of Zelda is also tied with Grand Theft Auto and Prince of Persia for franchises with the most adventure game awards won. In the early years of the Interactive Achievement Awards when there were multiple awards for adventure related genres, some games received multiple nominations in the same year:
 Riven: The Sequel to Myst (1998)): Nominated for Console Adventure Game of the Year and Computer Adventure Game of the Year.
 Prince of Persia: The Sands of Time (2004): Won Computer Action/Adventure Game of the Year and Platform Action/Adventure Game of the Year.
 Max Payne 2: The Fall of Max Payne (2004): Nominated for Console Action/Adventure Game of the Year and Computer Action/Adventure Game of the Year.
 Full Spectrum Warrior (2005): Nominated for Console Action/Adventure Game of the Year and Computer Action/Adventure Game of the Year.
Grand Theft Auto is the only franchise to win more than adventure game award in the same year, but with different games. In 2003 for Console Action/Adventure Game of the Year with Grand Theft Auto: Vice City and Computer Action/Adventure Game of the Year with Grand Theft Auto III. In addition these two games are also the only games to receive more than one nomination spread across more than one year:
 Grand Theft Auto III was nominated for Console Action/Adventure Game of the Year in 2002 and won Computer Action/Adventure Game of the Year in 2003.
 Grand Theft Auto: Vice City won Console Action/Adventure Game of the Year in 2003 and was nominated for Computer Action/Adventure Game of the Year in 2004. 
The only franchise to have back-to-back wins for the same adventure related award is Prince of Persia for Platform Action/Adventure Game of the Year in 2004 with Prince of Persia: The Sands of Time and 2005 with Prince of Persia: Warrior Within.

Notes

References

D.I.C.E. Awards
Awards established in 1998
Awards for best video game